"A Simple Game" is a 1968 song by the progressive rock band the Moody Blues. Written and sung by Mike Pinder, it was released as a non-album B-side to "Ride My See-Saw", a track from the album In Search of the Lost Chord. The song was produced by Tony Clarke and arranged by Arthur Greenslade. The track was covered by The Four Tops, and their version was issued as a single in the United States in January 1972, reaching #90 on the Billboard Hot 100. The song had already been issued as a single in Britain in September 1971, having reached #3 in the UK and #14 in Ireland.

Personnel
 Mike Pinder: mellotron, piano, lead vocals
 Justin Hayward: acoustic & electric guitars, backing vocals
 John Lodge: bass guitar, backing vocals
 Ray Thomas: tambourine, backing vocals
 Graeme Edge: drums

Four Tops version

The Four Tops released a cover version in the UK in 1971. The single peaked at position three on the chart. The song's B-side for the UK release was "You Stole My Love", a song written by Justin Hayward and Tony Clarke.

The song was released as a single in the U.S. in 1972, stalling on the chart at position 90. The B-side, which differed from its UK counterpart, was a song called "L.A. (My Town)".

Personnel
Levi Stubbs: vocals
Abdul "Duke" Fakir: vocals
Lawrence Payton: vocals
Renaldo Benson: vocals

Chart history

References

1968 songs
Songs written by Mike Pinder
The Moody Blues songs
Four Tops songs
Motown singles
1971 singles